Independent Party may refer to:

Independent Party (Argentina)
Independent Party (Burma)
Independent Party (Denmark)
Independent Party (Greece)
The Independent Party in Kenya
Independent Party (Laos)
Independent Party (South Africa)
Independent Party (Uruguay)

United States
American Independent Party
Greenback Party, originally known as the Independent Party, U.S.
Independent Party of Connecticut
Independent Party of Delaware
Independent Party of Florida
Independent Party of Oregon
United Independent Party (Massachusetts)

See also
Independent Democratic Party (disambiguation)
Independent Economic Party (disambiguation)
Independent Labour Party (disambiguation)
Independent Liberal Party (disambiguation)
Independent National Party (disambiguation)
Independent People's Party (disambiguation)
Independent Republican Party (disambiguation)
Independent Socialist Party (disambiguation)
Independent Group (disambiguation)
Independent politician, an individual politician not affiliated with any political party